Team Robredo–Pangilinan (TRoPa), also known as Tropang Angat, is an electoral alliance that supported Philippine vice president Leni Robredo's presidential campaign and Senator Francis Pangilinan's vice presidential campaign in the 2022 Philippine general election. Its senatorial slate included members of the Liberal Party, Akbayan, Katipunan ng Nagkakaisang Pilipino, and Ang Kapatiran. Guest candidates in the TRoPa slate are members of Bagumbayan–VNP, Nationalist People's Coalition, and United Nationalist Alliance.

Senatorial slate 
Robredo and her running mate, Kiko Pangilinan, endorsed the following candidates for the 2022 Philippine Senate election, thus making up the campaign's senatorial slate. Senate Majority Leader Juan Miguel Zubiri was initially part of the slate; however, he was removed on April 27, 2022, after a campaign against his inclusion in the roster was started by Robredo supporters in early April shortly after he endorsed Robredo's opponent, Bongbong Marcos.

References 

2021 establishments in the Philippines
Political party alliances in the Philippines